"Long Train Runnin" (or "Long Train Running") is a song recorded by the Doobie Brothers and written by band member Tom Johnston. It was included on the band's 1973 album The Captain and Me and was released as a single, becoming a hit and peaking at No. 8 on the US Billboard Hot 100.

It was covered by the Italian band Traks in 1982, and then by the British girl group Bananarama in 1991. In 1993, the Doobie Brothers' version was remixed and charted again in several countries, including reaching No. 7 on the UK Singles Chart.

Origin
The tune evolved from an untitled and mostly ad-libbed jam that the Doobies developed onstage years before it was finally recorded. Its working title, according to Johnston, was "Rosie Pig Moseley" and later "Osborn". "I didn't want to cut it," Johnston later confessed. "...I just considered it a bar song without a lot of merit. Teddy [Templeman], on the other hand, thought it had some." Templeman convinced Johnston to write words to the song.

Johnston performed the lead vocal and the rhythmic guitar strumming that propels the song and also performs the harmonica solo.

Reception
Billboard described it as "good-timey, good-harmony AM cooker." Cash Box praised the Doobies' "fine harmony and musical prowess."

Ultimate Classic Rock critic Michael Gallucci rated "Long Train Runnin the Doobie Brothers' second-greatest song, especially praising the guitar riff.  The staff of Billboard rated it as the Doobie Brothers' sixth-best song, noting how Johnston's and Patrick Simmons' "punchy guitars" contrast with "the jammy polyrhythms" in the bass and drums.

Personnel
Source:

Tom Johnston – lead guitar, harmonica, ARP synthesizer, vocals
Patrick Simmons – guitar, ARP synthesizer, vocals
Tiran Porter – bass, vocals
John Hartman – drums, percussion, vocals
Michael Hossack – drums, congas, timbales

Charts

Original release

Weekly charts

Year-end charts

Remixes

Weekly charts

Year-end charts

Other reissues

Certifications

Traks version

In 1982, Italian band Traks covered the song. This version charted in France and in West Germany, where it peaked at No. 62 and No. 18, respectively.

Track listing
 7" single Polydor 2040 365
"Long Train Runnin (short version) – 3:30
"Drums Power" – 4:27

Charts

Bananarama version

English pop trio Bananarama's version of "Long Train Runnin appeared on their fifth studio album, Pop Life (1991), and was released as the album's third single in the UK. The group discovered the song when they were browsing through the record collection of Youth, producer of the Pop Life album. They needed one more tune to complete Pop Life and decided to go with a cover. The song reached No. 10 in Portugal, No. 18 in Ireland and No. 30 in the UK.

Critical reception
Larry Flick from Billboard noted that here, "Bananarama offers a pop/house version of the Doobie Brothers' classic rocker "Long Train Running"." He added, "Produced by Youth, this first single from the forthcoming "Pop Life" album features guitar work from the Gipsy Kings, which provides a tough, rustic edge to an otherwise light and campy track. A fun one that could cross into radio territory." Chuck Eddy from Entertainment Weekly commented that "those techno-flamenco gods" help engineer the song "into a scary locomotive blues."

Music video
The Bananarama music video, directed by Nick Egan, features the group members dressed in Spanish gowns while attending a soirée with various guests at a castle. Scenes at a decorated dining table alternate with shots from bedrooms.

Track listing
 UK CD single NANCD 24
"Long Train Running" (radio version) – 3:31
Remixed by Mark 'Spike' Stent
"Long Train Running" (Alma De Noche Mix) – 6:40
Remixed by Mark 'Spike' Stent
"Long Train Running" (Flamenco CD Mix) – 4:57
"Outta Sight" – 4:30

Charts

References

1973 songs
1973 singles
1982 singles
1991 singles
Bananarama songs
The Doobie Brothers songs
London Records singles
Polydor Records singles
Song recordings produced by Ted Templeman
Songs about trains
Songs written by Tom Johnston (musician)
Warner Records singles
Music Week number-one dance singles